Raipuria is a village in Mirzapur district, Uttar Pradesh, India.

References

Villages in Mirzapur district